The 2009–10 Utah Jazz season was the 36th season of the franchise in the National Basketball Association (NBA).

In the playoffs, the Jazz defeated the Denver Nuggets in six games in the First Round, before getting swept by the eventual and back-to-back NBA champion, the Los Angeles Lakers, in the Semi-finals. This marked the third consecutive season the Jazz had their season ended by the Lakers.

Game 4 of the Conference Semi-finals was Jerry Sloan's final playoff appearance as head coach as he resigned the next season.

The Jazz would not return to the playoffs until 2012.

Key dates
 June 25 – The 2009 NBA draft took place in New York City.
 July 8 – The free agency period started.

Summary

NBA Draft 2009

Free agency

Draft picks

Roster

Pre-season

Regular season

Standings

Record vs. opponents

Game log

|- bgcolor=#ffcccc
| 1
| October 28
| @ Denver
| 
| Deron Williams (28)
| Carlos Boozer (11)
| Deron Williams (13)
| Pepsi Center19,155
| 0-1
|- bgcolor=#bbffbb
| 2
| October 30
| LA Clippers
| 
| Paul Millsap (23)
| Carlos Boozer (12)
| Deron Williams (9)
| EnergySolutions Arena19,911
| 1-1

|- bgcolor=#ffcccc
| 3
| November 2
| Houston
| 
| Mehmet Okur (21)
| Carlos Boozer (11)
| Deron Williams (8)
| EnergySolutions Arena19,911
| 1-2
|- bgcolor=#ffcccc
| 4
| November 3
| @ Dallas
| 
| Deron Williams (22)
| Mehmet Okur (14)
| Mehmet Okur, Deron Williams (5)
| American Airlines Center19,725
| 1-3
|- bgcolor=#bbffbb
| 5
| November 5
| San Antonio
| 
| Carlos Boozer, Deron Williams (27)
| Carlos Boozer (17)
| Deron Williams (9)
| EnergySolutions Arena19,797
| 2-3
|- bgcolor=#ffcccc
| 6
| November 7
| Sacramento
| 
| Deron Williams (29)
| Carlos Boozer (17)
| Deron Williams (15)
| EnergySolutions Arena18,825
| 2-4
|- bgcolor=#bbffbb
| 7
| November 9
| @ NY Knicks
| 
| Andrei Kirilenko, Carlos Boozer (23)
| Carlos Boozer (14)
| Deron Williams (16)
| Madison Square Garden19,355
| 3-4
|- bgcolor=#ffcccc
| 8
| November 11
| @ Boston
| 
| Ronnie Brewer, Deron Williams (13)
| Paul Millsap (13)
| Deron Williams, Eric Maynor (4)
| TD Garden18,624
| 3-5
|- bgcolor=#bbffbb
| 9
| November 13
| @ Philadelphia
| 
| Carlos Boozer (24)
| Carlos Boozer (12)
| Eric Maynor (11)
| Wachovia Center10,738
| 4-5
|- bgcolor=#ffcccc
| 10
| November 14
| @ Cleveland
| 
| Carlos Boozer (25)
| Carlos Boozer (12)
| Ronnie Brewer, Andrei Kirilenko (5)
| Quicken Loans Arena20,562
| 4-6
|- bgcolor=#bbffbb
| 11
| November 18
| Toronto
| 
| Carlos Boozer (22)
| Carlos Boozer (18)
| Deron Williams (9)
| EnergySolutions Arena17,879
| 5-6
|- bgcolor=#bbffbb
| 12
| November 19
| @ San Antonio
| 
| Deron Williams (21)
| Carlos Boozer (11)
| Deron Williams (9)
| AT&T Center17,519
| 6-6
|- bgcolor=#bbffbb
| 13
| November 21
| Detroit
| 
| Carlos Boozer, Andrei Kirilenko (22)
| Andrei Kirilenko (10)
| Deron Williams (11)
| EnergySolutions Arena18,355
| 7-6
|- bgcolor=#ffcccc
| 14
| November 24
| Oklahoma City
| 
| Carlos Boozer (26)
| Carlos Boozer, Andrei Kirilenko,Deron Williams (7)
| Deron Williams (9)
| EnergySolutions Arena17,937
| 7-7
|- bgcolor=#bbffbb
| 15
| November 26
| Chicago
| 
| Carlos Boozer (28)
| Paul Millsap (9)
| Ronnie Brewer, Andrei Kirilenko,Deron Williams (6)
| EnergySolutions Arena18,045
| 8-7
|- bgcolor=#bbffbb
| 16
| November 28
| Portland
| 
| Carlos Boozer (26)
| Carlos Boozer (12)
| Deron Williams (15)
| EnergySolutions Arena18,051
| 9-7
|- bgcolor=#bbffbb
| 17
| November 30
| Memphis
| 
| Ronnie Brewer (25)
| Carlos Boozer (15)
| Carlos Boozer (7)
| EnergySolutions Arena18,469
| 10-7

|- bgcolor=#bbffbb
| 18
| December 4
| Indiana
| 
| Carlos Boozer (35)
| Carlos Boozer (13)
| Deron Williams (12)
| EnergySolutions Arena19,347
| 11-7
|- bgcolor=#ffcccc
| 19
| December 5
| @ Minnesota
| 
| Carlos Boozer (21)
| Carlos Boozer (13)
| Deron Williams (11)
| Target Center18,466
| 11-8
|- bgcolor=#bbffbb
| 20
| December 7
| San Antonio
| 
| Carlos Boozer (27)
| Ronnie Brewer (10)
| Deron Williams (11)
| EnergySolutions Arena17,565
| 12-8
|- bgcolor=#ffcccc
| 21
| December 9
| @ LA Lakers
| 
| Deron Williams (17)
| Carlos Boozer (12)
| Deron Williams (8)
| Staples Center18,997
| 12-9
|- bgcolor=#bbffbb
| 22
| December 10
| Orlando
| 
| Deron Williams (32)
| Carlos Boozer (14)
| Deron Williams (15)
| EnergySolutions Arena18,735
| 13-9
|- bgcolor=#bbffbb
| 23
| December 12
| LA Lakers
| 
| Deron Williams (21)
| Carlos Boozer, Ronnie Brewer (8)
| Deron Williams (11)
| EnergySolutions Arena19,911
| 14-9
|- bgcolor=#ffcccc
| 24
| December 14
| Minnesota
| 
| Deron Williams (38)
| Carlos Boozer (14)
| Deron Williams (13)
| EnergySolutions Arena18,090
| 14-10
|- bgcolor=#bfb
| 25
| December 16
| @ New Jersey
| 
| Carlos Boozer (26)
| Carlos Boozer (10)
| Deron Williams (14)
| IZOD Center11,476
| 15-10
|- bgcolor=#fcc
| 26
| December 18
| @ Atlanta
| 
| Andre Kirilenko (13)
| Eric Maynor (7)
| Eric Maynor (7)
| Philips Arena17,501
| 15-11
|- bgcolor=#bfb
| 27
| December 19
| @ Charlotte
| 
| Deron Williams (23)
| Carlos Boozer (11)
| Deron Williams (10)
| Time Warner Cable Arena14,963
| 16-11
|- bgcolor=#fcc
| 28
| December 21
| @ Orlando
| 
| Paul Millsap (20)
| Mehmet Okur (9)
| Deron Williams (12)
| Amway Arena17,461
| 16-12
|- bgcolor=#fcc
| 29
| December 23
| @ Miami
| 
| Deron Williams (18)
| Carlos Boozer (8)
| Deron Williams (6)
| American Airlines Arena19,600
| 16-13
|- bgcolor=#bfb
| 30
| December 26
| Philadelphia
| 
| Deron Williams (27)
| Carlos Boozer, Paul Millsap (11)
| Deron Williams (8)
| EnergySolutions Arena19,911
| 17-13
|- bgcolor=#bfb
| 31
| December 30
| @ Minnesota
| 
| Deron Williams (21)
| Carlos Boozer (12)
| Deron Williams (12)
| Target Center14,123
| 18-13
|- bgcolor=#fcc
| 32
| December 31
| @ Oklahoma City
| 
| Carlos Boozer (17)
| Mehmet Okur (11)
| Ronnie Price (10)
| Ford Center18,203
| 18-14

|- bgcolor=#fcc
| 33
| January 2
| Denver
| 
| Carlos Boozer (18)
| Carlos Boozer (10)
| Deron Williams (6)
| EnergySolutions Arena19,911
| 18-15
|- bgcolor=#fcc
| 34
| January 4
| New Orleans
| 
| Carlos Boozer (18)
| Carlos Boozer (14)
| Deron Williams (11)
| EnergySolutions Arena19,911
| 18-16
|- bgcolor=#bfb
| 35
| January 6
| Memphis
| 
| C. J. Miles (24)
| Paul Millsap (9)
| Ronnie Brewer (10)
| EnergySolutions Arena19,008
| 19-16
|- bgcolor=#fcc
| 36
| January 8
| @ Memphis
| 
| Mehmet Okur (16)
| Carlos Boozer (12)
| Ronnie Price (9)
| FedExForum14,213
| 19-17
|- bgcolor=#bfb
| 37
| January 9
| @ Dallas
| 
| Deron Williams (20)
| Andre Kirilenko (8)
| Deron Williams (9)
| American Airlines Center19,922
| 20-17
|- bgcolor=#bfb
| 38
| January 11
| Miami
| 
| Carlos Boozer (25)
| Carlos Boozer (11)
| Deron Williams (10)
| EnergySolutions Arena19,284
| 21-17
|- bgcolor=#bfb
| 39
| January 14
| Cleveland
| 
| Carlos Boozer (19)
| Carlos Boozer (13)
| Carlos Boozer (6)
| EnergySolutions Arena19,911
| 22-17
|- bgcolor=#bfb
| 40
| January 16
| Milwaukee
| 
| C. J. Miles (19)
| Carlos Boozer, Mehmet Okur (12)
| Ronnie Price (7)
| EnergySolutions Arena19,669
| 23-17
|- bgcolor=#fcc
| 41
| January 17
| @ Denver
| 
| Deron Williams (23)
| Carlos Boozer (13)
| Deron Williams (13)
| Pepsi Center19,519
| 23-18
|- bgcolor=#bfb
| 42
| January 20
| @ San Antonio
| 
| Carlos Boozer (31)
| Carlos Boozer (13)
| Deron Williams (10)
| AT&T Center17,584
| 24-18
|- bgcolor=#bfb
| 43
| January 23
| New Jersey
| 
| Carlos Boozer (22)
| Mehmet Okur (11)
| Deron Williams (8)
| EnergySolutions Arena19,911
| 25-18
|- bgcolor=#bfb
| 44
| January 25
| Phoenix
| 
| Andre Kirilenko (25)
| Carlos Boozer (20)
| Deron Williams (11)
| EnergySolutions Arena19,911
| 26-18
|- bgcolor=#bfb
| 45
| January 27
| @ Portland
| 
| Deron Williams (24)
| Paul Millsap (12)
| Ronnie Brewer, Deron Williams (7)
| Rose Garden20,384
| 27-18
|- bgcolor=#bfb
| 46
| January 29
| Sacramento
| 
| Paul Millsap (32)
| Paul Millsap (14)
| Paul Millsap (7)
| EnergySolutions Arena19,480
| 28-18

|- bgcolor=#bfb
| 47
| February 1
| Dallas
| 
| Paul Millsap (25)
| Paul Millsap (9)
| Deron Williams (15)
| EnergySolutions Arena19,911
| 29-18
|- bgcolor=#bfb
| 48
| February 3
| Portland
| 
| Mehmet Okur (28)
| Paul Millsap (9)
| Deron Williams (13)
| EnergySolutions Arena19,911
| 30-18
|- bgcolor=#bfb
| 49
| February 6
| Denver
| 
| Andre Kirilenko, Deron Williams (22)
| Carlos Boozer (13)
| Deron Williams (9)
| EnergySolutions Arena19,911
| 31-18
|- bgcolor=#bfb
| 50
| February 9
| @ LA Clippers
| 
| Carlos Boozer (34)
| Carlos Boozer (14)
| Deron Williams (11)
| Staples Center15,467
| 32-18
|- bgcolor=#fcc
| 51
| February 10
| LA Lakers
| 
| Andre Kirilenko (17)
| Carlos Boozer (10)
| Deron Williams (10)
| EnergySolutions Arena19,911
| 32-19
|- bgcolor=#bfb
| 52
| February 16
| @ Houston
| 
| Mehmet Okur (21)
| Paul Millsap (12)
| Deron Williams (15)
| Toyota Center14,942
| 33-19
|- bgcolor=#bfb
| 53
| February 17
| @ New Orleans
| 
| Paul Millsap (24)
| Carlos Boozer (15)
| Deron Williams (10)
| New Orleans Arena13,561
| 34-19
|- bgcolor=#bfb
| 54
| February 19
| @ Golden State
| 
| Carlos Boozer (30)
| Carlos Boozer (16)
| Deron Williams (11)
| Oracle Arena18,322
| 35-19
|- bgcolor=#bfb
| 55
| February 21
| @ Portland
| 
| Carlos Boozer (22)
| Carlos Boozer (23)
| Deron Williams (12)
| Rose Garden20,565
| 36-19
|- bgcolor=#fcc
| 56
| February 22
| Atlanta
| 
| Paul Millsap (14)
| Carlos Boozer (10)
| Carlos Boozer (8)
| EnergySolutions Arena19,911
| 36-20
|- bgcolor=#bfb
| 57
| February 24
| Charlotte
| 
| Carlos Boozer (33)
| Carlos Boozer (16)
| Deron Williams (12)
| EnergySolutions Arena19,911
| 37-20
|- bgcolor=#fcc
| 58
| February 26
| @ Sacramento
| 
| Carlos Boozer (26)
| Mehmet Okur (11)
| Deron Williams (13)
| ARCO Arena12,938
| 37-21
|- bgcolor=#bfb
| 59
| February 27
| Houston
| 
| Deron Williams (35)
| Carlos Boozer, Mehmet Okur (8)
| Deron Williams (13)
| EnergySolutions Arena19,911
| 38-21

|- bgcolor=#fcc
| 60
| March 1
| @ LA Clippers
| 
| Carlos Boozer (20)
| Mehmet Okur (13)
| Deron Williams (13)
| Staples Center15,422
| 38-22
|- bgcolor=#bfb
| 61
| March 4
| @ Phoenix
| 
| Deron Williams (27)
| Carlos Boozer (15)
| Deron Williams (9)
| US Airways Center17,912
| 39-22
|- bgcolor=#bfb
| 62
| March 6
| LA Clippers
| 
| Mehmet Okur (27)
| Carlos Boozer (17)
| Deron Williams (10)
| EnergySolutions Arena19,911
| 40-22
|- bgcolor=#bfb
| 63
| March 9
| @ Chicago
| 
| Deron Williams (28)
| Carlos Boozer (10)
| Deron Williams (17)
| United Center18,451
| 41-22
|- bgcolor=#bfb
| 64
| March 10
| @ Detroit
| 
| Paul Millsap, Mehmet Okur,Deron Williams (18)
| Carlos Boozer (12)
| Deron Williams (12)
| Palace of Auburn Hills16,908
| 42-22
|- bgcolor=#fcc
| 65
| March 12
| @ Milwaukee
| 
| Carlos Boozer (26)
| Carlos Boozer (14)
| Deron Williams (9)
| Bradley Center14,917
| 42-23
|- bgcolor=#fcc
| 66
| March 14
| @ Oklahoma City
| 
| Wesley Matthews (29)
| Carlos Boozer (11)
| Deron Williams (14)
| Ford Center18,203
| 42-24
|- bgcolor=#bfb
| 67
| March 15
| Washington
| 
| Carlos Boozer (23)
| Carlos Boozer (11)
| Deron Williams (9)
| EnergySolutions Arena19,611
| 43-24
|- bgcolor=#bfb
| 68
| March 17
| Minnesota
| 
| Paul Millsap (21)
| Carlos Boozer, Paul Millsap (11)
| Deron Williams (11)
| EnergySolutions Arena19,851
| 44-24
|- bgcolor=#fcc
| 69
| March 19
| @ Phoenix
| 
| Carlos Boozer (23)
| Carlos Boozer (16)
| Deron Williams (6)
| US Airways Center18,422
| 44-25
|- bgcolor=#bfb
| 70
| March 20
| New Orleans
| 
| Paul Millsap (22)
| Paul Millsap (15)
| Deron Williams (11)
| EnergySolutions Arena18,766
| 45-25
|- bgcolor=#bfb
| 71
| March 22
| Boston
| 
| C. J. Miles (23)
| Mehmet Okur (15)
| Deron Williams (11)
| EnergySolutions Arena19,911
| 46-25
|- bgcolor=#bfb
| 72
| March 24
| @ Toronto
| 
| Carlos Boozer, Deron Williams (18)
| Carlos Boozer (11)
| Deron Williams (16)
| Air Canada Centre16,178
| 47-25
|- bgcolor=#fcc
| 73
| March 26
| @ Indiana
| 
| Mehmet Okur (27)
| Mehmet Okur (12)
| Deron Williams (12)
| Conseco Fieldhouse15,463
| 47-26
|- bgcolor=#bfb
| 74
| March 27
| @ Washington
| 
| Carlos Boozer, Mehmet Okur (22)
| Mehmet Okur (11)
| Deron Williams (12)
| Verizon Center15,312
| 48-26
|- bgcolor=#bfb
| 75
| March 29
| NY Knicks
| 
| Carlos Boozer (26)
| Carlos Boozer (14)
| Deron Williams (14)
| EnergySolutions Arena19,911
| 49-26
|- bgcolor=#bfb
| 76
| March 31
| Golden State
| 
| Carlos Boozer (25)
| Carlos Boozer (13)
| Deron Williams (19)
| EnergySolutions Arena19,617
| 50-26

|- bgcolor=#fcc
| 77
| April 2
| @ LA Lakers
| 
| Carlos Boozer, Deron Williams (20)
| Carlos Boozer (18)
| Deron Williams (10)
| Staples Center18,997
| 50-27
|- bgcolor=#bfb
| 78
| April 6
| Oklahoma City
| 
| Deron Williams (42)
| Carlos Boozer (15)
| Deron Williams (10)
| EnergySolutions Arena19,911
| 51-27
|- bgcolor=#fcc
| 79
| April 7
| @ Houston
| 
| Carlos Boozer (18)
| Carlos Boozer, Paul Millsap (11)
| Deron Williams (7)
| Toyota Center15,004
| 51-28
|- bgcolor=#bfb
| 80
| April 9
| @ New Orleans
| 
| Deron Williams (27)
| Paul Millsap (12)
| Deron Williams (16)
| New Orleans Arena16,624
| 52-28
|- bgcolor=#bfb
| 81
| April 13
| @ Golden State
| 
| Mehmet Okur (23)
| Paul Millsap (24)
| Deron Williams (7)
| Oracle Arena19,230
| 53-28
|- bgcolor=#fcc
| 82
| April 14
| Phoenix
| 
| Deron Williams (24)
| Mehmet Okur (11)
| Deron Williams (6)
| EnergySolutions Arena19,911
| 53-29

Playoffs

Game log

|- bgcolor="#ffcccc"
| 1
| April 17
| @ Denver
| 
| Deron Williams (26)
| Paul Millsap (10)
| Deron Williams (11)
| Pepsi Center19,155
| 0–1
|- bgcolor="#bbffbb"
| 2
| April 19
| @ Denver
| 
| Deron Williams (33)
| Carlos Boozer (15)
| Deron Williams (14)
| Pepsi Center19,155
| 1–1
|- bgcolor="#bbffbb"
| 3
| April 23
| Denver
| 
| Deron Williams (24)
| Paul Millsap (19)
| Deron Williams (10)
| EnergySolutions Arena19,911
| 2–1
|- bgcolor="#bbffbb"
| 4
| April 25
| Denver
| 
| Carlos Boozer (31)
| Carlos Boozer (13)
| Deron Williams (13)
| EnergySolutions Arena19,911
| 3–1
|- bgcolor="#ffcccc"
| 5
| April 28
| @ Denver
| 
| Deron Williams (34)
| Carlos Boozer (16)
| Deron Williams (9)
| Pepsi Center19,155
| 3–2
|- bgcolor="#bbffbb"
| 6
| April 30
| Denver
| 
| Wesley Matthews (23)
| Carlos Boozer (20)
| Deron Williams (10)
| EnergySolutions Arena19,911
| 4–2

|- bgcolor="#ffcccc"
| 1
| May 2
| @ L. A. Lakers
| 
| Deron Williams (24)
| Carlos Boozer (12)
| Deron Williams (8)
| STAPLES Center18,997
| 0–1
|- bgcolor="#ffcccc"
| 2
| May 4
| @ L. A. Lakers
| 
| Paul Millsap (26)
| Carlos Boozer (12)
| Deron Williams (9)
| STAPLES Center18,997
| 0–2
|- bgcolor="#ffcccc"
| 3
| May 8
| L. A. Lakers
| 
| Deron Williams (28)
| Carlos Boozer (14)
| Deron Williams (9)
| EnergySolutions Arena19,911
| 0–3
|- bgcolor="#ffcccc"
| 4
| May 10
| L. A. Lakers
| 
| Deron Williams, Paul Millsap (21)
| Carlos Boozer (14)
| Deron Williams (9)
| EnergySolutions Arena19,911
| 0–4

Player statistics

Regular season

|-
| 
| 78 || style="background-color:#6BABDD;color:#FFFFFF"| 78 || 34.3 || style="background-color:#6BABDD;color:#FFFFFF"| .562 || .000 || .742 || style="background-color:#6BABDD;color:#FFFFFF"| 11.2 || 3.2 || 1.08 || 0.46 || style="background-color:#6BABDD;color:#FFFFFF"| 19.5
|-
| 
| 49 || 5 || 8.3 || .547 || .000 || .421 || 1.8 || 0.3 || 0.12 || 0.39 || 2.6
|-
| 
| 32 || 0 || 6.8 || .463 || .269 || .500 || 0.9 || 1.2 || 0.38 || 0.00 || 3.3
|-
| 
| 14 || 0 || 5.2 || .414 || .000 || .684 || 1.4 || 0.1 || 0.29 || 0.00 || 2.6
|-
| 
| 58 || 35 || 29.0 || .506 || .292 || .744 || 4.6 || 2.7 ||style="background-color:#6BABDD;color:#FFFFFF"| 1.43 ||style="background-color:#6BABDD;color:#FFFFFF"| 1.22 || 11.9
|-
| 
| 52 || 0 || 18.3 || .493 || style="background-color:#6BABDD;color:#FFFFFF"| .536 || .796 || 2.1 || 1.7 || 0.50 || 0.23 || 7.2
|-
| 
| 36 || 0 || 4.8 || .468 || .000 || .600 || 1.3 || 0.2 || 0.06 || 0.11 || 1.5
|-
| 
| style="background-color:#6BABDD;color:#FFFFFF"|82 || 48 || 24.7 || .483 || .382 || style="background-color:#6BABDD;color:#FFFFFF"| .829 || 2.3 || 1.5 || 0.78 || 0.18 || 9.4
|-
| 
| 63 || 28 || 23.8 || .429 || .341 || .695 || 2.7 || 1.7 || 0.92 || .27 || 9.9
|-
| 
| style="background-color:#6BABDD;color:#FFFFFF"|82 || 2 || 27.8 || .538 || .111 || .693 || 6.8 || 1.6 || 0.78 || 1.21 || 11.6
|-
| 
| 73 || 73 || 29.4 || .458 || .385 || .820 || 7.1 || 1.6 || 0.52 || 1.11 || 13.5
|-
| 
| 60 || 4 || 13.4 || .405 || .286 || .695 || 1.2 || 2.1 || 0.67 || 0.22 || 4.3
|-
| 
| 76 || 76 || style="background-color:#6BABDD;color:#FFFFFF"| 36.9 || .469 || .371 || .801 || 4.0 ||style="background-color:#6BABDD;color:#FFFFFF"| 10.5 || 1.26 || 0.21 || 18.7
|}

Source: ESPN.com

Playoffs

|-
| 
| style="background-color:#6BABDD;color:#FFFFFF"| 10 || style="background-color:#6BABDD;color:#FFFFFF"| 10 || style="background-color:#6BABDD;color:#FFFFFF"| 40.2 || .530 || . || .543 || style="background-color:#6BABDD;color:#FFFFFF"| 13.2 || 3.0 || .4 || .7 ||  19.7
|-
| 
| style="background-color:#6BABDD;color:#FFFFFF"| 10 || 9 || 18.1 || .433 || . || .333 || 3.9 || 1.2 || .0 || .5 || 3.3
|-
| 
| 5 || 0 || 1.4 || .833 || style="background-color:#6BABDD;color:#FFFFFF"| 1.000 || .000 || .4 || .0 || .0 || .0 || 2.2
|-
| 
| 6 || 0 || 1.7 || .167 || . || .000 || .2 || .0 || .0 || .0 || .3
|-
| 
| 2 || 0 || 15.0 || .500 || .000 || style="background-color:#6BABDD;color:#FFFFFF"| 1.000 || 3.0 || .0 || .5 || .5 || 5.5
|-
| 
| style="background-color:#6BABDD;color:#FFFFFF"| 10 || 0 || 21.0 || .525 || .478 || .889 || 1.1 || 1.3 || .5 || .0 || 8.3
|-
| 
| 9 || 0 || 3.4 || .400 || . || . || 1.0 || .0 || .0 || .1 || .9
|-
| 
| style="background-color:#6BABDD;color:#FFFFFF"|10 || style="background-color:#6BABDD;color:#FFFFFF"| 10 || 37.1 || .386 || .357 || .813 || 4.4 || 1.7 || style="background-color:#6BABDD;color:#FFFFFF"| 1.8 || .5 || 13.2
|-
| 
| style="background-color:#6BABDD;color:#FFFFFF"| 10 || style="background-color:#6BABDD;color:#FFFFFF"| 10 || 33.7 || .443 || .326 || .897 || 2.5 || 2.8 || .6 || .6 || 14.4
|-
| 
| style="background-color:#6BABDD;color:#FFFFFF"|10 || 0 || 32.3 || .574 || .000 || .690 || 8.8 || 2.2 || 1.1 || style="background-color:#6BABDD;color:#FFFFFF"| 1.4 || 18.0
|-
| 
| 1 || 1 || 11.0 || style="background-color:#6BABDD;color:#FFFFFF"| 1.000 || style="background-color:#6BABDD;color:#FFFFFF"| 1.000 ||  style="background-color:#6BABDD;color:#FFFFFF"| 1.000 || 2.0 || .0 || .0 || .0 || 7.0
|-
| 
| style="background-color:#6BABDD;color:#FFFFFF"| 10 || 0 || 9.0 || .292 || .286 || .500 || 1.0 || 1.4 || .4 || .1 || 2.0
|-
| 
| style="background-color:#6BABDD;color:#FFFFFF"| 10 || style="background-color:#6BABDD;color:#FFFFFF"| 10 || 39.8 || .450 || .392 || .802 || 2.7 ||style="background-color:#6BABDD;color:#FFFFFF"| 10.2 || 1.0 || .4 || style="background-color:#6BABDD;color:#FFFFFF"| 24.3
|}

Awards, records and milestones

Awards

Week/Month
 Carlos Boozer was named Western Conference Player of the Week twice (Nov. 30 – Dec. 6 and Feb. 15 – Feb. 21).
 Deron Williams was named Western Conference Player of the Week for the week of December 7.
 Carlos Boozer was named Western Conference Player of the Month for February. During this month, he averaged 21.2 points on .604 shooting, along with 13.0 rebounds per game.

All-Star
 Deron Williams was selected to play in the All-Star Game for the first time in his career.

Season
 Deron Williams was named to the All-NBA Second Team.

Records
 Kyle Korver broke the NBA record for 3-pt field goal percentage, by making 53.6% of his attempts.

Milestones
 On January 4, 2010, Deron Williams passed the 3000 assists mark in a loss to the New Orleans Hornets.

Injuries and surgeries

Transactions

Trades

Free agents

Additions

Subtractions

References

External links
 2009–10 Utah Jazz season at ESPN
 2009–10 Utah Jazz season at Basketball Reference

Utah Jazz seasons
Utah
Utah
Utah